Vili Resnik (born November 27, 1963) is a Slovenian rock singer and guitarist.

Biography 
Since his youth he was active in various sorts of bands as a guitarist and singer.  He also learned to play violin at school.  From 1990 to 1995 he was the frontman of the Slovenian rock band Pop Design, with whom he released several albums. He was selected to represent his country at the Eurovision Song Contest 1998 in Birmingham with his ballad "Naj bogovi slišijo". At Eurovision, Resnik ended up in 18th place in the field of 25.

Resnik also made an appearance in the Slovenian TV series Lepo je biti sosed.

Albums 
Zdaj Živim (1996)
Rad Bi Bil S Teboj (1997)
Zadnji Žigolo (1998)
Odiseja (2000)
Reka Želja (2004)
Svet Je Lep (2014)

References

External links 

 Official website (in Slovenian)
 

1963 births
Living people
Slovenian pop singers
Eurovision Song Contest entrants for Slovenia
Eurovision Song Contest entrants of 1998
21st-century Slovenian male singers
Slovenian rock singers
20th-century Slovenian male singers